Le Mozart des pickpockets (also known as The Mozart of Pickpockets) is a 2006 French short film. Written and directed by Philippe Pollet-Villard, it won the 2007 Oscar for Best Live Action Short Film.  It was the only French submission in the category. Two days before, the film also won its national César Award.

Cast
 Matteo Razzouki-Safardi as L'enfant
 Philippe Pollet-Villard as Philippe
 Richard Morgiève as Richard
 Samir Guesmi as Ahmed, le réceptionniste
 Emiliano Suarez as Max
 Jean Sarguera as Pickpocket 1
 Jean Camaccio as Pickpocket 2

Plot
Richard and Philippe live hand to mouth, backing up a gang of Romanian pickpockets on the streets of Paris, posing as policemen who arrest a gang member while the others rifle the pockets and purses of gawkers. When all of the gang except Richard and Philippe are pinched, things look grim.

Then, Richard insists that they take in a wide-eyed immigrant lad, a deaf-mute left behind in the arrests. Philippe suggests a three-person pickpocket trick, using the boy, but when that goes spectacularly badly, they hit rock bottom.

References

External links
 

2006 films
2006 drama films
Films set in Paris
French drama short films
2000s French-language films
French independent films
Live Action Short Film Academy Award winners
2000s French films